Terreblanche or Terre Blanche, literally "White Land" may refer to:

 Domaine de Terre Blanche
 Eugène Terre'Blanche
 Sampie Terreblanche

See also 
 Belaya Zemlya
 The White Land